Isatu Fofanah (born 13 April 1993) is a Canadian sprinter. She competed in the 4 × 100 metres relay at the 2015 World Championships in Beijing finishing sixth in the final.

International competitions

Personal bests
Outdoor
100 metres – 11.46 (+1.5 m/s, Edmonton 2015)
200 metres – 23.72 (+1.1 m/s, El Paso 2015)
Indoor
60 metres – 7.36 (Flagstaff 2013)
200 metres – 24.13 (Birmingham, AL 2015)

References

External links
 
 

1993 births
Living people
Canadian female sprinters
Black Canadian track and field athletes
World Athletics Championships athletes for Canada
Place of birth missing (living people)
Athletes (track and field) at the 2010 Summer Youth Olympics
Sierra Leonean emigrants to Canada